Colin Cameron Emery (4 July 1946) was a Scottish amateur football outside right who played in the Scottish League for Queen's Park. He was capped by Scotland at amateur level.

References

Scottish footballers
Scottish Football League players
Queen's Park F.C. players
Association football outside forwards
Scotland amateur international footballers
Living people
Footballers from Glasgow
Third Lanark A.C. players
1946 births